Country Calendar is a New Zealand documentary television series focusing on rural life in New Zealand. It has been aired on TVNZ 1 since March 1966, making it New Zealand's longest-running television series. Since 2013 the show aired for a season of 30 weeks per year, however as of 2016 it is being broadcast for 40 weeks a year. Episodes from the 2013 season to present are available to watch online, through TVNZ+.

Country Calendar is currently produced by Julian O’Brien, with associate producer Dan Henry. Frank Torley was well known as the narrator of the show, and also produced the show for 23 years. Torley died in March 2016 following a short battle with cancer.

The Country Calendar theme song is from the song "Hillbilly Child" by the Alan Moorhouse Band. Hyundai New Zealand is the show's naming rights sponsor, with previous sponsors including The National Bank, financial services company AMP, and Tux dog biscuits.

History 
Country Calendar was first broadcast on 6 March 1966, primarily as a news show for farmers. It was presented by Fred Barnes, and was approximately 14 minutes in length. The show was primarily shot in a studio, with around 5 minutes shot in the field usually, due to budget constraints. The first field report focussed on a Central Otago apricot orchard.

The show was originally developed to be strictly for farmers, however when Tony Trotter became producer of the show in 1974 he decided to market the show towards a more general audience. Trotter also chose the Country Calendar theme music, Hillbilly Child by British musician Alan Moorhouse, which is still used by the show today.

Frank Torley began contributing to the show as a reporter in its first few years, and 10 years later moved to the show full-time, becoming producer in 1980. He was well known as the "gravelly Mr Country Calendar voice", and became the show's full-time narrator from the start of 2014. Torley retired from the show in October 2015, after developing vocal nodules. He died in March 2016 after a short battle with cancer.

In the 1990s Country Calendar moved to Saturday nights, after 23 years being broadcast on Sunday. The 1990s was also the first time a sponsor was added to the show's title.

Country Calendar has received NZ on Air funding since 1991, and is the longest running programme the agency has funded.

In 2005 a special 40 Years of Country Calendar episode was broadcast, comprising some of the show's highlights and detailing the show's history.

In 2011 Hyundai New Zealand became the show's naming rights sponsor, taking over from The National Bank. 2011 also marked the first year the show was broadcast in high definition.

Similar to during the show's 40th anniversary in 2005, in 2016 a special episode titled Country Calendar: 50 Golden Years was broadcast to celebrate Country Calendar being on air for 50 years. The special was hosted by broadcaster Jim Hickey, who had previously hosted the show for 5 years from 1998.

A Country Calendar exhibition opened at Waikato museum on 11 June 2016, to celebrate 50 years of the show.

In 2017 "Hyundai Country Calendar" was returned to Sundays at 7.00pm.

Production 
Country Calendar is one of the longest-running television series in New Zealand (by number of years on air), after Coronation Street. There have been at least 1000 episodes broadcast, although the show's producer suggests between 1200 and 1250 is more likely.

Country Calendar is currently produced by Julian O’Brien, who first became involved in the show in 1985 before taking a break and then returning as producer in 2005. The show's associate producer is Dan Henry, who is also the narrator, taking over from former narrator Frank Torley after his retirement in October 2015. O’Brien and Henry also direct the show, along with directors Katherine Edmond, Kerryanne Evans, Michael Huddleston, Celia Jaspers, Richard Langston, Roz Mason, Howard Taylor, and Vicki Wilkinson-Baker. The show's researcher is Vivienne Jeffs, who has held the role since 2007.

From 2013 the show has had 30 episodes per season, although this was increased to 40 episodes in 2016. According to Country Calendar'''s production blog, the show will have crew on the road for close to 250 days, in order to produce the 40 episodes. Country Calendar usually focuses on one story per episode.

In 2016 Country Calendar received $566,720 of NZ on Air funding, from the Documentary and Factual programme fund. This was increased from $425,036 in 2015, the same amount as in 2014 and 2013, due to the 10 extra episodes as of 2016. NZ On Air say that Country Calendar is "consistently the highest-rating NZ On Air funded programme, with more than half a million people tuning in every week". 583,500 people aged 5 or over watched the 2015 series on average.Country Calendar is known to sometimes feature spoofs, where the series will occasionally break format and air an unannounced satirical episode. In 1974, a spoof episode aired focusing on the fictional character Fred Dagg (portrayed by satirist John Clarke). A spoof was first aired in 1977 with a farmer playing a fence as a musical instrument, and since then have included sheep dogs controlled by radio and a high fashion range of rural clothing, among others. While the spoofs were generally well-received, the radio-controlled dog episode resulted in numerous calls of it being inhumane. A Country Calendar – Spoofs Special highlighting the spoof episodes of the show was broadcast in 1999. The last part of the 2016 program marking the show's 50th anniversary was a spoof featuring an app designed to let farmers talk to their working dogs.

There are 10 Country Calendar DVDs on sale, including ‘Best of’ DVDs for each season from 2014 to 2017, as well as DVDs comprising episodes on different topics. These include Country Calendar Goes Fishing, Country Calendar on Horseback and Country Calendar Goes Green. The 50th anniversary special is also available on DVD. The NZ On Screen website also features some archived special episodes of the show which can be viewed online.

 Awards Country Calendar'' has won numerous awards during its time on air.

See also
Agriculture in New Zealand

References

External links
 TVNZ Country Calendar website
 40 years of Country Calendar at NZ On Screen

Agriculture in New Zealand
1966 in New Zealand television
1966 New Zealand television series debuts
1960s New Zealand television series
1970s New Zealand television series
1980s New Zealand television series
1990s New Zealand television series
2000s New Zealand television series
2010s New Zealand television series
New Zealand documentary television series
Television shows about agriculture
Television shows funded by NZ on Air
TVNZ 1 original programming